Carysfort was a borough constituency for Carysfort, now Macreddin, in County Wicklow represented in the Irish House of Commons until its abolition on 1 January 1801.

History
In the Patriot Parliament of 1689 summoned by James II, Carysfort was represented with two members.

Members of Parliament, 1634–1801
1634–1635 Guildford Slingsby. and John Hoey
1639–1649 Philip Mainwaring and Francis Cosbie
1661–1666 Thomas Maule and John Boswell

1689–1801

Notes

References

Bibliography

Constituencies of the Parliament of Ireland (pre-1801)
Historic constituencies in County Wicklow
1629 establishments in Ireland
1800 disestablishments in Ireland
Constituencies established in 1629
Constituencies disestablished in 1800